Marine Light Attack Helicopter Squadron 775 (HMLA-775) is a reserve United States Marine Corps helicopter squadron consisting of Bell AH-1Z Viper attack helicopters and Bell UH-1Y Venom utility helicopters. The squadron was reactivated from cadre status on 1 Oct 2016 and is based at Marine Corps Base Camp Pendleton, California and falls under the command of Marine Aircraft Group 41 (MAG-41) and the 4th Marine Aircraft Wing (4th MAW).

The detachment/squadron team functioned in the same manner as that of its active duty counterparts minus the regular overseas deployments. To enhance the squadron's readiness and demonstrate its versatility, HMLA-775 also participated in anti-drug operations in conjunction with federal agencies in locations such as Key West, Florida, Bahamas, Puerto Rico, Nassau, South America, California, Klamath Oregon and Jamaica.

History

Early years
Marine Helicopter Transport Squadron 775 (HMR-775) was activated September 2, 1958 at Naval Air Station Niagara Falls, New York, and assigned to Marine Air Reserve Training Command. Initial strength at activation was 2 officers. HMR-775 relocated to NAS Willow Grove, effective February 28, 1959. During this period HMR-775 operated the Piasecki HUP-2 "Retriever".

HMR-775 was redesignated Marine Medium Helicopter Squadron 775 (HMM-775) on 1 April 1962, and assigned to Marine Aircraft Group 46, 4th Marine Aircraft Wing. HMM-775 was deactivated September 30, 1962.

In March 1988, the first personnel and aircraft of what would eventually become Marine Aircraft Group 46 Detachment E, Marine Attack Helicopter Squadron 775 began arriving at Marine Corps Base Camp Pendleton, California.

On January 7, 1989 the unit was commissioned as MAG-46 Det E, HMA-775, MALS-46 Det E became a complement of eight 1968 model AH-1J's. This was the standup of the first Reserve Cobra Squadron on the west coast. The squadron became complete with 12 vintage AH-IJ SeaCobra helicopters.

On December 1, 1990,  HMA-775 and its 12 AH-1J Cobras, was activated for deployment to Southwest Asia.  The unit deployed to Southwest Asia on January 5, 1991 to Jubail, Saudi Arabia in support of Operation Desert Shield and Desert Storm. The "Coyotes" participated in every major battle from Khafji to the final assault on Kuwait City, flying over 970 combat hours and accumulating 641 combat sorties. The squadron then remained in-country, in support of Operation Desert Comfort. By May 15, 1991 the final personnel and aircraft arrived back at MCB Camp Pendleton.

In May 1992 the squadron received the first eight of what would eventually total 12 AH-1W Super Cobras.   A flash flood struck the Marine Corps Air Station Camp Pendleton in January 1993. The aircraft and building spaces suffered severe damage.  The first aircraft flew again on February 25. By mid-April, the squadron had moved into new temporary spaces and all aircraft were flying. During the July change of command, the "Coyotes" were awarded the Ensign Pierce Award for being the Marine Air Reserve Helicopter Squadron of the year in 1992.

HMLA-775 was attached to its active counterpart Mag-46 Det A (Detachment Alpha) who flew, maintained and operated the squadron on a daily basis. This small active component was responsible for the training and support of HMLA-775 during their drill weekends, active periods and unit activations for wartime deployment.

On May 10, 1994 the Squadron moved into a new hangar - their first permanent home at Camp Pendleton. On June 18, six UH-1N Huey utility helicopters were added to inventory and on August 6, the squadron was officially redesignated Marine Light Attack Helicopter Squadron 775 (HMLA-775), thus becoming the first HMLA in the 4th Marine Aircraft Wing.

The Squadron functioned in the same manner as that of its active duty counterparts minus deploying overseas on the Marine Expeditionary Unit or regularly rotated stations. To enhance the squadron's readiness and demonstrate its versatility, HMLA-775 also participated in anti-drug and Border Patrol operations in support of Federal Agencies in locations such as Key West, FL, Bahamas, Puerto Rico, Nassau, South America, California, Oregon, Idaho, Arizona, New Mexico, Texas, Nevada, and Jamaica.

Global War on Terror
HMLA-775 deployed with its sister squadron HMLA-775 Det A ( out of Johnstown, Pa), in support of Operation Iraqi Freedom two times.  The first time was early 2004 when they flew in support of the I Marine Expeditionary Force. The bulk of their flying during this time was providing close air support in and around the city of Fallujah during Operation Vigilant Resolve and follow-on operations.  HMLA-775 redeployed to Iraq in early 2005 to provide close air support for the II Marine Expeditionary Force.

Decommissioning
On September 6, 2008, HMLA-775 was decommissioned after 20 years of service.

Reactivation
On October 1, 2016, HMLA-775 was reactivated and currently resides at MCAS Camp Pendleton.

The first Bell AH-1Z Viper arrived on November 18, 2019.

See also

 United States Marine Corps Aviation
 List of inactive United States Marine Corps aircraft squadrons

References

Notes

Bibliography

Web

 HMLA-775 @ Globalsecurity.org

External links
 HMLA-775's official website

LA775
Military units and formations in California
Inactive units of the United States Marine Corps